Sabash Sariyana Potti is a 2011 Indian Tamil-language comedy film directed by  television actor Venu Arvind which marked his directorial debut.  The film stars Jayaram and Sriram Karthik. The film has a musical score by S. Thaman. The film received negative reviews. The name of the film is based on a dialogue from the song "Kannum Kannum Kalanthu". The film was partially re-shot in Malayalam and released as Kochi to Kodambakkam in 2012.

Cast
Jayaram as JR
Sriram Karthik as Guru
Sriranjini 
Pragathi
Delhi Ganesh
Mayilsamy
Vaiyapuri
Venu Arvind as John
Deepa Narendra
Jairam
Anjana Thambiratti
Valentine
Kaali Venkat
Fathima Babu as "Sabash Sariyana Potti" judge
Mohan Raman as "Sabash Sariyana Potti" judge

Soundtrack
The music was composed by S. Thaman.

Release 
The New Indian Express wrote that "But as it happens many a time, what may have seemed good on paper, is just not exciting enough when translated on to screen".

References

External links

2011 films
2010s Tamil-language films
Films scored by Thaman S